Bethlehem Shipbuilding San Pedro  was a major shipbuilding company on Terminal Island in San Pedro, California owned by Bethlehem Shipbuilding Corporation. To support the World War 2 demand for ships Bethlehem Shipbuilding San Pedro built: US Navy Destroyers and after the war tugboats. The yard became involved in World War II production in the early shipbuilding expansions initiated by the Two-Ocean Navy Act of July 1940. At its peak during the war about 6,000 worked at the yard, Bethlehem Shipbuilding San Pedro shipyard was opened in 1918 as Southwestern Shipbuilding by Western Pipe & Steel. Western Pipe & Steel sold the shipyard to Bethlehem Shipbuilding Corporation in 1925.  Shipbuilding ended after World War 2 in 1946. In 1983 the shipyard was sold to Southwest Marine. In 1997 Southwest Marine operated four shipyards, which they sold to The Carlyle Group.  Carlyle Group renamed the shipyard US Marine Repair. In 2002 US Marine Repair sold all six of its yards to United Defense Industries. In 2005 it was sold to BAE Systems but the yard was not used and the yard is now part of the Port of Los Angeles.  The shipyard was located at 1047 South Seaside Ave, San Pedro.

World War II
Bethlehem Shipbuilding San Pedro destroyers built from 1942 to 1945: 

 26 of 415 destroyers
 4 of 30 
  ... 
 10 of 175 
  ... 
 , 
  ... 
 5 of 58 
 
  ... 
 
 3 of 12  destroyer minelayers
  ... 
 4 of 98 
  ... 

 4 s
USS Acoma (YTB-701) 
 YT Arawak YTM-702, removed from US Navy in December 1985  
 YT Canarsee, US Navy sold in 1975
 YT  Moratok, US Navy sold in 1985.

Southwestern Shipbuilding

Southwestern was the second largest of three steel shipyards in the Ports of Los Angeles and Long Beach active during the World War I shipbuilding boom, responsible for 28% of the tonnage built there for the United States Shipping Board.

Many of the ships were Design 1019 ships built under the USSB's Emergency Fleet Corporation (EFC) contacts.
Ships built:

See also

California during World War II
Maritime history of California

References

American Theater of World War II
1940s in California
Bethlehem shipyards
Defunct shipbuilding companies of the United States
Shipyards building World War II warships